Anne Iversen (12 August 1923 – 6 July 2015) was a Danish athlete. She competed in the women's high jump at the 1948 Summer Olympics.

References

1923 births
2015 deaths
Athletes (track and field) at the 1948 Summer Olympics
Danish female high jumpers
Olympic athletes of Denmark
Place of birth missing